Seifenbach is a river of Saxony, Germany in the area of the town Johanngeorgenstadt. It is a right tributary of the Schwarzwasser.

See also
List of rivers of Saxony

References

Rivers of Saxony
Rivers of Germany